Get a Life is the sixth studio album by Stiff Little Fingers, released in 1994 (see 1994 in music).

Track listing
"Get a Life" (Burns) – 5:53
"Can't Believe in You" (Burns) – 4:58
"The Road to Kingdom Come" (Burns) – 3:27
"Walk Away" (Burns) – 5:20
"No Laughing Matter" (Burns) – 2:52
"Harp" (Burns) – 3:49
"Forensic Evidence" (Burns) – 3:39
"Baby Blue (What Have They Been Telling You?)" (Burns) – 4:02
"I Want You" (Russell Emanuel, Dolphin Taylor) – 4:05
"The Night That the Wall Came Down" (Burns) – 3:51
"Cold" (Burns) – 4:10
"When the Stars Fall from the Sky" (Burns, Foxton) – 3:50
"What If I Want More" (Burns) – 1:38

Personnel
Stiff Little Fingers
Jake Burns	 - vocals, guitar
Bruce Foxton - bass, backing vocals
Dolphin Taylor - drums, backing vocals
Technical
Jamie Cullum -	assistant engineer, assistant
The Engine Room - mixing
Karl Trout - artwork, graphic design, art direction, concept design

References

1994 albums
Stiff Little Fingers albums